William Noble Andrews (November 13, 1876 – December 27, 1937) was a Congressman for the 1st congressional district of Maryland who served one term from 1919 to 1921.

Early life
William Noble Andrews was born on November 13, 1876, in Hurlock, Maryland. He attended Dixon College for one year. He graduated from Wesley Collegiate Institute of Dover, Delaware in 1898 and from the law department of the University of Maryland at Baltimore in 1903 with a Bachelor of Laws. He was admitted to the bar in 1903 and commenced the practice of law in Cambridge, Maryland soon after.

Career
From 1904 to 1911, Andrews served two terms as state attorney for Dorchester County, Maryland. He served as a member of the Maryland House of Delegates in 1914, and in the Maryland State Senate from 1918 until 1919, when he resigned to enter Congress. He was elected as a Republican to the sixty-sixth U.S. Congress in 1918, and served the Maryland's 1st congressional district for one full term from March 4, 1919, to March 3, 1921. He was an unsuccessful candidate for reelection in 1920, and resumed the practice of law until his death.

Personal life
Andrews married Bessie Walworth on October 18, 1903. She died on January 21, 1919. Andrews married Helen Virginia Phillips of Cambridge on December 10, 1919. They divorced in 1924.

Death
Andrews died on December 27, 1937, at Cambridge Hospital in Cambridge. He is interred in Washington Cemetery of Hurlock, Maryland.

References

External links

William Noble Andrews entry at The Political Graveyard

1876 births
1937 deaths
People from Dorchester County, Maryland
Wesley College (Delaware) alumni
University of Maryland Francis King Carey School of Law alumni
Maryland lawyers
Republican Party Maryland state senators
Republican Party members of the Maryland House of Delegates
Republican Party members of the United States House of Representatives from Maryland